Myrmecocystus is a North American genus of ants in the subfamily Formicinae. It is one of five genera that includes honeypot ants. Worker ants keep and tend plerergates, which are other ants that store large quantities of nutritious fluid in their abdomens to feed the colony during famine times. Some species engage in highly territorial tournaments, which can result in intraspecific slavery. During the raids, they carry off larvae, workers, and plerergates.

Species 

Myrmecocystus christineae Snelling, 1982
Myrmecocystus colei Snelling, 1976
Myrmecocystus creightoni Snelling, 1971
Myrmecocystus depilis Forel, 1901
Myrmecocystus ewarti Snelling, 1971
Myrmecocystus flaviceps Wheeler, 1912
Myrmecocystus hammettensis Cole, 1938
Myrmecocystus intonsus Snelling, 1976
Myrmecocystus kathjuli Snelling, 1976
Myrmecocystus kennedyi Snelling, 1969
Myrmecocystus koso Snelling, 1976
Myrmecocystus lugubris Wheeler, 1909
Myrmecocystus melanoticus Wheeler, 1914
Myrmecocystus melliger Forel, 1886
Myrmecocystus mendax Wheeler, 1908
Myrmecocystus mexicanus Wesmael, 1838
Myrmecocystus mimicus Wheeler, 1908
Myrmecocystus navajo Wheeler, 1908
Myrmecocystus nequazcatl Snelling, 1976
Myrmecocystus perimeces Snelling, 1976
Myrmecocystus placodops Forel, 1908
Myrmecocystus pyramicus Smith, 1951
Myrmecocystus romainei Hunt & Snelling, 1975
Myrmecocystus semirufus Emery, 1893
Myrmecocystus snellingi Bolton, 1995
Myrmecocystus tenuinodis Snelling, 1976
Myrmecocystus testaceus Emery, 1893
Myrmecocystus wheeleri Snelling, 1971
Myrmecocystus yuma Wheeler, 1912

Media 
Natural World: Empire of the Desert Ants, BBC TWO 10 August 2011, 8 pm BST; information about it on BBC Nature

References

External links 

Formicinae
Hymenoptera of North America
Ant genera
Edible insects